Munden Guy Morgan (born August 11, 1960) is a retired American professional basketball player born in Virginia Beach, Virginia.

A 6'8" shooting guard from Wake Forest University, Morgan was selected by the Indiana Pacers in the second round of the 1982 NBA Draft. He played eight games for the Pacers during the 1982–83 NBA season, scoring 15 points.

Notes

1960 births
Living people
American men's basketball players
Basketball players from Virginia
Indiana Pacers draft picks
Indiana Pacers players
McDonald's High School All-Americans
Parade High School All-Americans (boys' basketball)
Shooting guards
Sportspeople from Virginia Beach, Virginia
Wake Forest Demon Deacons men's basketball players